William Everard may refer to:

Wiliam Everard (14th century MP) for Norwich (UK Parliament constituency)
William Everard (Digger) (c. 1602 – d. in or after 1651), early leader of the Diggers
William Everard (Victorian politician) (1869–1950), member of the Victorian Legislative Assembly for the electoral district of Evelyn
William Everard (South Australian politician) (1819–1889), member of South Australia's Legislative Assembly and Legislative Council
William Everard (brewer), founder of Everards Brewery in Leicester
Sir William Lindsay Everard (1891–1949), brewer and grandson of the first William Everard, politician and philanthropist from Leicestershire, United Kingdom